Brezik Našički is a small village 3 kilometers from Našice, Osijek-Baranja County, Croatia. Population is 352 (2011).

History 

It grew on the wilderness of Count Pejačević's estate, and was first mentioned in 1896. Brezik is named after the birch forest that once grew there. The first house in the area was the lodge of Count Pejačević. However, the first inhabitants were the family of Nikola and Matilda Baricevic who moved in 1918 from Jasenica with their five sons and two daughters. The first child in the village was born in their family in 1926.

Catholics and Orthodox Christians from Lika settled in Brezik. They were laborers on the estate of Count Pejačević. Many immigrants were recorded arriving from 1938 until the 1950s. New families included the Knezevic, Nekic and Vulics.

Economy 

In 1965 the village was electrified. The villagers built a dirt road that merged Brezik and Našice in 1972. By 2000, the village had access to other utilities including water and gas.

References

External links
 Našice parish
 Dalmatinci i Ličani naselili i razvili mjesto Brezik Našički 

Populated places in Osijek-Baranja County
Slavonia